The 2015–16 Euroleague Basketball Next Generation Tournament, also called Adidas Next Generation Tournament by sponsorship reasons, is the 14th edition of the international junior basketball tournament organized by the Euroleague Basketball Company.

As in past years, 32 teams joined the first stage, which are played in four qualifying tournaments between December 2015 and February 2016. The four group winners, Real Madrid as reigning champions and three wildcarded teams will join the Final Tournament, that will be played in Berlin on May 12–15.

Qualifying tournaments

Torneo Città di Roma
The Torneo Città di Roma was played on December 27 to 29, 2015.

Group A

Group B

Classification games

7th place game

5th place game

3rd place game

Final

Torneig de Bàsquet Junior Ciutat de L'Hospitalet
The Torneig de Bàsquet Junior Ciutat de L'Hospitalet was played on January 4 to 6, 2016.

Group A

Group B

Semifinals

Classification games
7th place game

5th place game

No third place game was played

Final

Kaunas International Junior Tournament
The Kaunas International Junior Tournament was played on January 15 to 17, 2016.

Group A

Group B

3rd place game

Final

Belgrade International Junior Tournament
The Belgrade International Junior Tournament was played from February 26 to 28, 2016.

Group A

Group B

Semifinals

Classification games
7th place game

5th place game

3rd place game

Final

Final tournament
Alba Berlin, FC Barcelona Lassa, INSEP and Lietuvos Rytas received a wild card for joining the final tournament with the four qualifying tournament winners (title holder Real Madrid, Mega Bemax, who changed sponsorship naming from the qualifying tournament, Žalgiris and Crvena Zvezda Telekom).

All games of the Group A and the Group B played at Sportforum Hohenschönhausen. The final game was played at Mercedes-Benz Arena on the same day of the 2015–16 Euroleague Final.

Group A

Group B

Final

References

External links
Next Generation tournament website

Euroleague Basketball Next Generation Tournament
Next Generation Tournament